The name Chaba has been used to name four tropical cyclones in the northwestern Pacific Ocean. The name was contributed by Thailand and refers to the Chinese hibiscus (Hibiscus rosa-sinensis).

 Typhoon Chaba (2004) (T0416, 19W) – A strong super typhoon that devastated Japan in 2004.
 Typhoon Chaba (2010) (T1014, 16W, Katring) – approached Japan.
 Typhoon Chaba (2016) (T1618, 21W, Igme) – A super typhoon that affected South Korea and Japan in October 2016.
 Typhoon Chaba (2022) (T2203, 04W, Caloy) – made landfall in southwestern Guangdong province, China; 26 people were killed when an offshore crane vessel split in half during the storm and sank

Pacific typhoon set index articles